Philibert Dié Foneye  is an Ivorian football defender who played for Ivory Coast in the 1980 African Cup of Nations.

External links
11v11 Profile

Year of birth missing (living people)
Living people
Ivorian footballers
Ivory Coast international footballers
1980 African Cup of Nations players
Association football defenders